Scottie is an album by organist Shirley Scott recorded in 1958 for the Prestige label.

Reception

The Allmusic review stated "This is early Scott".

Track listing 
 "Mr. Wonderful" (Jerry Bock, George David Weiss, Larry Holofcener)
 "How Deep Is the Ocean?" (Irving Berlin) 
 "Time On My Hands" (Vincent Youmans)
 "Hong Pong" (Shirley Scott)
 "Takin' Care of Business" (Shirley Scott)
 "Cherry" (Don Redman) 
 "Diane" (Erno Rapee, Lew Pollack) 
 "Please Send Me Someone to Love" (Percy Mayfield)

Personnel 
 Shirley Scott - organ
 George Duvivier - bass
 Arthur Edgehill - drums

References 

1959 albums
Albums produced by Esmond Edwards
Albums recorded at Van Gelder Studio
Prestige Records albums
Shirley Scott albums